Nazia Iqbal (born c.1984) is a Pashtun singer from Pakistan.  She was affiliated with Peshawar Zalmi cricket team as an ambassador. She performs across the globe especially in United Arab Emirates, United Kingdom and other parts of the world. She also sings in Urdu, Persian, and Arabic.

She currently resides in London, United Kingdom with her children. She divorced Javid Feza, whom she had been married to since 2005, in 2019.

See also 
 List of Pashto-language singers

References 

Living people
Pashto-language singers
People from Swat District
Pakistani expatriates in the United Arab Emirates
Pashtun women
1984 births
21st-century Pakistani women singers